Tonquin is an unincorporated locale in Washington County, Oregon, United States.

Tonquin was a station on the Oregon Electric Railway,  named for the Pacific Fur Company ship Tonquin, because of the company's policy of naming stations for topics of historic interest to Oregonians. The station was built in 1907–08. Tonquin post office was established in 1909, and closed in 1924.

The station was 12 miles from Multnomah and 12 miles from Donald, on what is now the main line of the Portland and Western Railroad. Tonquin is on the portion of the line used by the Westside Express Service passenger train. The abandoned Oregon Electric substation/depot still exists at the site today.

References

External links
Images and history of Tonquin station

Unincorporated communities in Washington County, Oregon
1912 establishments in Oregon
Unincorporated communities in Oregon
Historic American Engineering Record in Oregon